De Vink is a Dutch and Afrikaans surname, meaning "the finch". It can refer to:

Gregory de Vink (1998–2020), South African racing cyclist
Jacques de Vink (born 1942), Dutch volleyball player

Dutch-language surnames
Afrikaans-language surnames